Sullivan County Courthouse is a historic courthouse located at Sullivan, Sullivan County, Indiana. It was built between 1926 and 1928, and is a three-story, nearly square, steel frame and concrete, Beaux-Arts style building faced in limestone.  All four faces are nearly identical and feature a traditional Corinthian order composite cornice.  The central of each facade has a rounded arch parapet with clock. The building is nearly identical to the Vermillion County Courthouse.

It was listed on the National Register of Historic Places in 2008.

References

External links

County courthouses in Indiana
Courthouses on the National Register of Historic Places in Indiana
Beaux-Arts architecture in Indiana
Government buildings completed in 1928
Buildings and structures in Sullivan County, Indiana
National Register of Historic Places in Sullivan County, Indiana